Michael Shih (born 10 December 1964) is a Taiwanese Hokkien pop singer who won the 2007 Golden Melody Award for best Taiwanese male singer.

He is a fan of the Warcraft video games.

References

External links

1964 births
Living people
21st-century Taiwanese  male singers
20th-century Taiwanese  male singers
Taiwanese Buddhists
Taiwanese Hokkien pop singers
Taiwanese singer-songwriters